Une famille à louer is a 2015 French-Belgian comedy film directed by Jean-Pierre Améris and starring Benoît Poelvoorde and Virginie Efira.

Cast 
 Benoît Poelvoorde as Paul-André Delalande 
 Virginie Efira as Violette Mandini 
 François Morel as Léon
 Philippe Rebbot as Rémi
 Pauline Serieys as Lucie Mandini 
 Calixte Broisin-Doutaz as Auguste Mandini
 Édith Scob as Madame Delalande 
 Nancy Tate as Sandra
 Rémy Roubakha as Lucien
 Xavier Mathieu as Fabian
 Gwendoline Hamon as Fabian's wife

References

External links 
 

2015 films
2015 comedy films
2010s French-language films
French comedy films
Belgian comedy films
Films directed by Jean-Pierre Améris
StudioCanal films
2010s French films